Sine Novela is a Philippine television drama series broadcast by GMA Network. The series is a television adaptation of the Philippine films. It premiered on April 30, 2007 on the network's Dramarama sa Hapon line up replacing Princess Charming. The series concluded on October 22, 2010 with a total of 21 instalments and 1,727 episodes. It was replaced by Little Star in its timeslot.

Episodes

Sine Novela's Bakit Kay Tagal ng Sandali? was shelved.

Accolades

2007
 21st PMPC Star Awards for Television
 Nominated, Best Actor, Carlo Aquino (Sinasamba Kita)
 Winner, Best Daytime Drama Series (Sinasamba Kita)

2008
 22nd PMPC Star Awards for Television
 Winner, Best Daytime Drama Series - Kaputol ng Isang Awit
 Nominated, Best Daytime Drama Series - Maging Akin Ka Lamang
 Nominated, Best Daytime Drama Series - My Only Love
 Nominated, Best Drama Actor - Tirso Cruz III (Kaputol ng Isang Awit)
 Nominated, Best Drama Actress - Lovi Poe (Kaputol ng Isang Awit)

2009
 23rd PMPC Star Awards for Television
 Nominated, Best Daytime Drama Series - Saan Darating ang Umaga?

37th International Emmy Awards
 Nominated, Best Telenovela - Saan Darating ang Umaga?

2010
24th PMPC Star Awards for Television
Nominated, Best Daytime Drama Series - Kung Aagawin Mo ang Lahat sa Akin

References

External links
 

2007 Philippine television series debuts
2010 Philippine television series endings
GMA Network drama series